The Chromosomal Rearrangements In Diseases (dbCRID) is a database of human chromosome rearrangements events and diseases related to them.

See also
 Chromosome rearrangements

References

External links
 https://web.archive.org/web/20110814091330/http://dbcrid.biolead.org/

Biological databases
Chromosomes
Cytogenetics